Narmad Suvarna Chandrak (Gujarati: નર્મદ સુવર્ણ ચંદ્રક), also known as the Narmad Gold Medal or Narmad Chandrak, is a literary honour in Gujarat, India. It is bestowed by the organisation known as Narmad Sahitya Sabha, Surat, in remembrance of renowned Gujarati poet Narmad. Each year, the medal is awarded to the author of the most outstanding book written in the Gujarati language.

Recipients 

The recipients of the Narmad Suvarna Chandrak listed by year:

References

Awards established in 1940
Gujarati literary awards
1940 establishments in India